Alberto Ferreira de Jesus (born 26 September 1919, date of death unknown), also known as Ferreirinha, was a Portuguese footballer who played as a forward. He earned two caps for Portugal in 1948, playing against Spain and the Republic of Ireland.

External links

References

1919 births
Year of death missing
Association football forwards
C.F. Os Belenenses players
G.D. Estoril Praia players
Portugal international footballers
Portuguese footballers